The 1927 Rome Grand Prix (formally the III Reale Premio Di Roma) was a Grand Prix motor race held at Circuito Parioli on 12 June 1927. The race was held over 100 laps of a 4.2 km circuit, for a total race distance of 420 km. The race was won by Tazio Nuvolari driving a Bugatti. This race marked the first and only time the Rome Grand Prix was held in Parioli.

Classification

Sources

Rome Grand Prix
Rome Grand Prix